The HVDC Visby–Näs is a bipolar HVDC electric power transmission system between Visby and a wind power centre near Näs on Gotland, Sweden. The project went into service in 1999. The system operates at 80 kV with a maximum power of 50 megawatts.  This HVDC system allows for voltage regulation in the connected AC systems.

Because obtaining a right-of-way for an overhead line is a lengthy and expensive procedure, the 70 kilometer line is constructed as an underground cable. Since an alternating current three-phase underground cable would have been more expensive, the HVDC system was selected for this project.

Sites

External links 
  Gotland: the first commercial HVDC Light project

HVDC transmission lines
Electric power infrastructure in Sweden
Gotland
Visby
Energy infrastructure completed in 1999
1999 establishments in Sweden